Welt (formerly N24) is a German free-to-air television news channel owned by WeltN24 GmbH. It also provides regular news updates to ProSiebenSat.1 Media properties like ProSieben and kabel eins.

On 21 September 2017, WeltN24 announced that N24 would be rebranded as "Welt" on 18 January 2018. WeltN24 also publishes Die Welt, a conservative-leaning newspaper.

History 
In the late 1990s, in the heat of the dot-com bubble ProSieben Media Group, then consisting of two TV channels (ProSieben and Kabel 1) whose programming largely consisted of US movies, sitcoms and series, tried to take over German television news channel n-tv, then owned by Handelsblatt and CNN. After the attempt failed, ProSieben Media purchased German newswire ddp (now dapd) and announced the launch of its own news channel soon afterwards, by consolidating ProSieben's news department. The channel was launched on 24 January 2000 at noon, from ProSieben Media's headquarters in Unterföhring near Munich. In collaboration with Bloomberg Television, N24 provided live coverage of financial markets around the world. Apart from running its own network, Welt also provided ProSieben and Kabel 1 with newscasts.

In the same year, ProSieben Media AG purchased rival channel Sat.1, located in Berlin, which had a news department of its own and ran a number of factual programmes. ProSieben Media AG renamed itself ProSiebenSat.1 Media AG afterwards. After the merger, N24 moved from Unterföhring to Sat.1's headquarters in Berlin in July 2001, and the news departments of Sat.1 and N24 were combined.

In 2002, ProSiebenSat.1's majority owner, KirchMedia, filed for bankruptcy. While ProSiebenSat.1 itself was not broke, an extended search for a buyer, during which ProSiebenSat.1 was effectively owned by KirchMedia's banks, created uncertainty at the company. This combined with the market crisis after the end of the dotcom bubble and 9/11, caused ProSiebenSat.1 to cut costs. It replaced a number of newscasts on N24, especially in the afternoons, the evenings and on the weekends, with cheaper documentaries. Business and stock market coverage was also cut dramatically, and remaining business reports were bought from CNBC Europe instead of producing them in-house. The reports featured CNBC's proprietary graphics. In 2007, N24 strengthened its business coverage, introducing daily programmes such as Börse am Mittag ["Stock Market Afternoon"] and Börse am Abend ["Stock Market Evening"]. The channel moved its headquarters in October 2008.

In 2008, ProSiebenSat.1 sold its property in Berlin and announced that Sat.1 would move to Unterföhring, where ProSieben and Kabel 1 were already based. N24 would relocate within Berlin. In 2010, ProSiebenSat.1 sold N24 to a group of private investors, led by former Der Spiegel editor Stefan Aust. N24 was contracted by ProSiebenSat.1 to continue providing Sat.1, ProSieben and Kabel 1 with newscasts at least until 2016. In 2013, N24 was acquired by Axel Springer SE and combined with Die Welt to form WeltN24.

On 17 September 2016, a sister channel called N24 Doku launched free to air, which is a one-hour delayed timeshift channel of Welt in the afternoon and replaces some news broadcasts by documentaries in the morning.

Programming 
Welt previously broadcast a variety of programming, with more than seven hours of live programming per business day. CNBC correspondents Silvia Wadhwa, Patricia Szarvas, Roland Klaus, Michael Mross and Bruni Schubert report live from the Frankfurt Stock Exchange, the LSE and the NYSE throughout the day. Since August 2010, news programming has been cut back, with no program lasting more than 15 minutes.

Previous Welt newscasts:

Currently, Welt runs news on the hour, every hour.

Anchors and reporters 

 Pia Ampaw
 Robert Annetzberger
 Dietmar Deffner
 Marc Dickgreber
 Ralf Finke
 Michel Friedman
 Astrid Frohloff
 Petra Glinski
 Hans-Hermann Gockel
 Carsten Hädler
 Hans-Peter Hagemes
 Alexandra Karle
 Andrea Kempter
 Thomas Klug
 Dieter Kronzucker
 Peter Limbourg (chief editor)
 Michaela Mey
 Wenzel Michalski
 Tatjana Ohm
 Florian Otto
 Gaby Papenburg
 Petra Papke
 Inge Posmyk
 Milena Preradovic
 Alexander Privitera
 Christina Prüver
 Julia Scherf
 Katrin Sandmann
 Sandra Schiffauer
 Hajo Schumacher
 Thomas Schwarzer
 Steffen Schwarzkopf
 Alexander Simon
 Thomas Spahn
 Stephan Strothe
 Claus Strunz
 Bruder Paulus Terwitte
 Hans-Hermann Tiedje
 Marcus Tychsen
 Claudia von Brauchitsch
 Alexander von Roon
 Verena Wriedt

Programming

Talk 

 Studio Friedman, hosted by Michel Friedman (2004–present)

N24 Doku 

On 9 June 2016, WeltN24 announced the launch of N24 Doku as the timeshift channel of N24 in the autumn  of 2016.  On 20 July 2016, it was announced that the broadcaster would start on 17 September 2016.

Austrian feed 
On 27 April 2012 the SES Astra satellite platform has been showing an Austrian subfeed of N24 (transponder 3, 11,244 GHz horizontal, SR 22,000, FEC 5/6). Nothing has been reported to the press about the launch of the station. A few days later, the transmitter was switched off again. On 16 July 2012 the broadcasting code N24 HD Austria was launched. On 2 April 2016, N24 Austria started its broadcast via Astra 1N. On 18 January 2018 N24 Austria was replaced by N24 Doku Austria.

Station logos

References

External links 
Official Website (in German)

Television channels and stations established in 2000
24-hour television news channels in Germany
2000 establishments in Germany
Television stations in Berlin